The 2000–01 British National League season was the fifth season of the British National League, the second level of ice hockey in Great Britain. 10 teams participated in the league, and the Guildford Flames won the championship.

Regular season

Playoffs

Group A

Gruppe B

Semifinals 
 Guildford Flames - Slough Jets 5:2, 5:2
 Peterborough Pirates - Basingstoke Bison 2:2, 1:3

Final 
 Guildford Flames - Basingstoke Bison 7:2, 5:2

External links 
 Season on hockeyarchives.info

British National League (1996–2005) seasons
United
2